Chennakesava Reddy is a 2002 Indian Telugu-language action film, produced by Bellamkonda Suresh under the Sri Sai Ganesh Productions banner and directed by V. V. Vinayak. It stars Nandamuri Balakrishna, Tabu, Shriya Saran and music composed by Mani Sharma. The film was a hit at the box office.

Plot 
The film begins in Rayalaseema where the followers of a powerful factionist Chennakesava Reddy genuflect before his idol and eagerly wait for his arrival from the past 22 years. As of today, the terrain is under the demonic influence of Dhanunjaya Reddy with the backing of his 3 siblings Minister Jai Reddy, Justice Ravi Reddy, & Krishna Reddy. Chennakesava Reddy’s younger Janaki is knitted with Krishna Reddy who is subjected to torment. Now at Mumbai, DCP Bharat that resembles Chennakesava Reddy is a stout-hearted cop and a diehard to the criminals. He squabbles with a medico Preethi the daughter of Commissioner Prasad and the contretemps goes on until a crush. 

In the interim, a sincere SP Ramaraju is deputed in Rayalaseema and hinders the outrages of Dhanunjaya Reddy. Once, he views the idol of Chennakesava Reddy and knowledge of his eminence. Eventually, falls victim to the political clout and is transferred to Tihar Jail. Suddenly, he detects Chennakesava Reddy as a captive under remand for 22 years. Anyhow, SP succeeds in acquitting him with the legal proceedings. Forthwith, Chennakesava Reddy assassinates Minister Jai Reddy, back to his hometown and the public pompously welcomes him. 

Immediately, he thunderbolts on foes and regains his ownership. Plus, embraces his sister Janaki and states it's inevitable to eliminate her husband which she approves. Then, it transpires Bharat is the son of Chennakesava Reddy who walks to his father with his mother Devi. Shortly, Preeti lands therein and the elders fix their alliance. Simultaneously, the evildoers discern Bharat is a mettlesome that can confront his father and shield them. So, they empower him to this region. Next, Chennakesava Reddy starts his murder spree and wipes out Justice Ravi Reddy. Consequently, Krishna Reddy plots and backstabs him when Janaki butchers her husband. Just as, Bharat reaches to whom Janaki divulges the fact and spins rearward. 

Chennakesava Reddy is generous and the most revered arbiter of the terrain. He holds a fierce rivalry with malicious Venkat Reddy, the father of these black guards. At one time, he witnesses another one Giri Reddy of Venkat Reddy killing an innocent. Hence, Chennakesava Reddy reprisals by snuffing him as a penalty. Here, infuriated Venkat Reddy cabals by knitting Krishna Reddy with Janaki. On that eve Venkat Reddy & sons hack the entire family to death. On the verge to terminate Chennakesava Reddy falls short and slays Venkat Reddy. Moreover, pays off in crossing his wife & son the border. Thereupon, the knaves wangle false allegations and seized him. Listening to it, Bharat understands his father’s virtue but is constrained to his duty. For the time being, Chennakesava Reddy is in hiding when Bharat artifices Devi’s death and he let out. Thereat, Devi stabs herself as her husband’s notion must never be wrong. Following, Bharat surrounds him from 4 sides when he gallantly absconds with a chase. Tragically, Devi leaves her breath in his lap. During her funeral, Chennakesava Reddy is trickily apprehended and jailed. Meanwhile, Dhanunjaya Reddy takes political entry when Chennakesava Reddy breaks the bars, onslaughts in a public meeting, and slaughters him with aid of Bharat. At last, Chennakesava Reddy proceeds to sentence and orders Bharat to be seated in his position. Finally, the movie ends on a happy note with Bharat continuing his father's legacy.

Cast 

 Nandamuri Balakrishna in a dual role as Chennakesava Reddy and Bharath Reddy
 Tabu as Devi Reddy, Chennakesava's wife and Bharath's mother
 Shriya Saran as Preethi, Bharath's love interest
 Jaya Prakash Reddy as Venkat Reddy
 Anand Raj as Dhanunjaya Reddy
 Mohan Raj as Jai Reddy
 Brahmanandam as Seema Sastry
 Ali  as Lagaan Khan
 Annapurna as Draupadi, Chennakesava Reddy's mother
 Devayani as Janaki, Chennakesava Reddy's sister
 Pruthvi as Krishna Reddy, Chennakesava Reddy's brother-in-law
 Devan as Judge Ravi Reddy
 L.B. Sriram as Hippi Lahari
 Venu Madhav as Prisoner
 Siva Krishna as S.P. Ramaraju
 Ahuti Prasad as Sivaji Reddy, Seeta's brother
 Chalapathi Rao as Sathi Reddy
 Vizag Prasad as Police Commissioner Prasad
 Raghu Babu as Giri Reddy, Venkat Reddy's son
 Nagineedu as Minister
 Ponnambalam
 M. S. Narayana
 Fish Venkat as Venkat

Soundtrack 

Music was composed by Mani Sharma. Music was released on Supreme Music Company.

Reception 
The Hindu critic Gudipoodi Srihari in his review appreciated Balakrishna's portrayal of dual roles of father and son, in addition to Sharma's music score. However, he added that: "The father-son clash looks routine and dilutes the spirit of the movie." Sify rated 3/5 and criticised the film stating, "It is the same old Rayalaseema faction fight recreated with more sprinkling of blood and gore."

References

External links 

2000s Telugu-language films
2002 action drama films
2002 films
Films directed by V. V. Vinayak
Films scored by Mani Sharma
Films set in Andhra Pradesh
Indian action drama films
Indian films about revenge